Aminevo (Ämin) is a rural locality (a village) in Temyasovsky Selsoviet, Baymaksky District, Bashkortostan, Russia. The population was 277 as of 2010. There are 6 streets.

Geography 
Aminevo is located 58 km north of Baymak (the district's administrative centre) by road. Derevnya Kozhzavoda is the nearest rural locality.

References 

Rural localities in Baymaksky District